Spilarctia variata is a moth in the family Erebidae. It was described by Franz Daniel in 1943. It is found in China (Jiangsu, Zhejiang, Fujian, Guangdong, Sichuan, Yunnan, Guangxi, Shaanxi, Jiangxi, Tibet).

Subspecies
 Spilarctia variata variata
 Spilarctia variata pseudohampsoni Daniel, 1943

References

Moths described in 1943
variata